Minkler is a surname. Notable people with the surname include:

B. D. Minkler (1849–1911), American politician
Bob Minkler (1937–2015), American sound engineer
Joshua Minkler (born 1963), American attorney
Lee Minkler, American sound engineer
Meredith Minkler (born 1946), American public health researcher
Michael Minkler (born 1952), American motion picture sound re-recording mixer